The 2018 Arizona gubernatorial election took place on November 6, 2018, to elect the Governor of Arizona, concurrently with the election of Arizona's Class I U.S. Senate seat, as well as other elections to the United States Senate in other states and elections to the United States House of Representatives and various state and local elections.

The primary was held on August 28. Despite considerably closer contests in other Arizona state elections, which included Democratic gains for U.S. Senate, Secretary of State, and Superintendent of Public Instruction, incumbent Republican Governor Doug Ducey won a second term, with a slightly increased majority from his 2014 win and the largest margin of victory of any statewide candidate on the ballot. This was the first Arizona gubernatorial election since 1990 in which the winner was of the same party as the incumbent U.S. president.

Republican primary

Candidates

Nominee
 Doug Ducey, incumbent governor

Eliminated in primary
 Ken Bennett, former secretary of state of Arizona
 Robert Weber (write-in)

Endorsements

Polling

Results

Democratic primary

Candidates

Nominee
 David Garcia, Arizona State University professor and nominee for Superintendent of Public Instruction in 2014

Eliminated in primary
 Steve Farley, state senator
 Kelly Fryer, nonprofit executive and activist
 Mirza Fareed "Fareed" Baig (write-in)

Declined
 Terry Goddard, former Arizona Attorney General and nominee for governor in 2010 and 1990
 Kyrsten Sinema, U.S. Representative (running for U.S. Senate)
 Greg Stanton, Mayor of Phoenix (running for AZ-09)

Endorsements

Polling

Results

Libertarian primary

Candidates

Disqualified
 Jeff Funicello, activist
 Barry Hess (write-in)
 Kevin McCormick, candidate for president in 2016

Endorsements

Green primary

Candidates

Nominee
 Angel Torres (write-in)

Eliminated in primary
 Noah Dyer (write-in)

Results

Independents

Candidates

Disqualified
 Noah Dyer, author, businessman and educator
 Christian R. Komor, author, psychologist, climate scientist

Declined
 Tim Jeffries, former director of the Arizona Department of Economic Security

General election

Debates

Predictions

Polling

with Steve Farley

with generic Democrat

with Kyrsten Sinema

Results

Results by County

Results by Congressional District

Voter Demographics

References

External links
 Candidates at Vote Smart
 Candidates at Ballotpedia

Official campaign websites
 Doug Ducey (R) for Governor
 David Garcia (D) for Governor
 Angel Torres (G) for Governor
 Christian Komor (No Party; write-in) for Governor
 Patrick Masoya (No Party; write-in) for Governor

Gubernatorial
2018
Arizona